Fabien Baussart is the founder and president of the think tank Center of Political and Foreign Affairs (CPFA), which organizes events and discussions on various geopolitical topics around the world with prominent political figures such as Zbigniew Brzezinski, Kofi Annan, José María Aznar, Mohamed ElBaradei, and Al Gore.

Biography 
Baussart is a businessman who has invested in Russia, Ukraine and Kazakhstan. In 2005 he founded Xorus Press Inc.' which published the French and Russian editions of Foreign Policy and invested in various media outlets in Ukraine, Russia and France. In 2010, Baussart sponsored a new art magazine entitled Le Monde de l'Art, which launched in Paris and was directed by the writer Guillaume de Sardes. He also sponsored the KitSon Club, a French think tank.

Fabien Baussart worked on solving various political crises, focusing particularly on Libya and Syria, by facilitating peace talks between different protagonists.

In 2015, as president of CPFA, he initiated peace talks on Syria in Astana with Randa Kassis by appealing to the first Kazakhstan president Nursultan Nazarbayev.

Political initiatives

Peace in Syria 
In 2015 Baussart and Randa Kassis appealed to the President of Kazakhstan, Nursultan Nazarbayev to launch a peaceful solution to the crisis and launch a political platform that could assemble moderate Syrian opponents.

Two first meeting was chaired by the Kazakh Foreign Minister Erlan Idrissov in May 2015. The second meeting was opened by the Secretary of State of Kazakhstan Gulshara Abdykalikova and mediated by Fabien Baussart and the Kazakh Deputy Foreign Minister Askar Mussinov. The meetings resulted in two resolutions being signed by the participants, which created the Astana Platform and helped pave the way for the peace process in Astana.

In February and July 2017 Baussart and Kassis initiated discussions in Geneva to develop a preparatory document to reform the Syrian Constitution. This initiative was promoted during the National Conference in Sochi in January 2018 by Randa Kassis despite objections from the Syrian government and part of the opposition.

Peace talks – Kazakhstan 
In 2015, Fabien Baussart launched a "Committee of the Wise" that would address various issues related to international peace.

The committee gathered several prominent political figures and Nobel Peace Prize laureates, including former Israeli President Shimon Peres, former Vice President of Egypt and general-director of the International Atomic Energy Agency Mohamed ElBaradei, former President of Poland Lech Walesa, Guatemalan human rights activist Rigoberta Menchu Tom and Chairman of the IPCC Rajendra Pachauri, former President of Colombia Cesar Gaviria and former Spanish Prime Minister Jose Luis Zapatero. The Committee met in Nur Sultan, Kazakhstan, where they were received by President Nazarbayev in the Presidential Palace.

Nuclear Non – Proliferation Initiative 
In 2016 Baussart organised a conference on nuclear non-proliferation with guest speakers Kofi Annan, Bronislaw Komorowski, Jack Straw, Yasar Yakis and Giulio Terzi.

References 

1973 births
Living people
Businesspeople from Paris
French company founders
21st-century French businesspeople